Gisela Reichmann was an Austrian figure skater who competed in ladies' singles.

She won the silver medal in ladies' single skating at the 1923 World Figure Skating Championships.

Competitive highlights

References 

Austrian female single skaters
Date of birth missing
Date of death missing